Alain Brigion Tobe (born November 6, 1986) is a Cameroonian swimmer, who specialized in sprint freestyle events. Tobe represented Cameroon at the 2008 Summer Olympics in Beijing, and competed for the men's 50 m freestyle. He won the fifth heat in the event, with a time of 24.53 seconds, finishing sixty-first in the overall standings.

References

External links
NBC Olympics Profile
 

1986 births
Living people
Cameroonian male freestyle swimmers
Olympic swimmers of Cameroon
Swimmers at the 2008 Summer Olympics